Dmytro Romanovych Semeniv (born 24 June 1998) is a Ukrainian professional footballer who plays as a midfielder for Pirin Blagoevgrad.

Career
Born in Odesa Oblast, Semeniv is a product of the FC Viktoriya from the settlement of Avanhard in the Odesa Oblast and FC Chornomorets youth system.

He first played for Real Pharma Odesa in the Ukrainian Second League, but in February 2016 he signed a contract with Chornomorets Odesa and played in the Ukrainian Premier League Reserves. Two years later, in February 2018 was promoted to the senior squad.

In January 2023, Semeniv signed for First League club Pirin Blagoevgrad.

References

External links 

1998 births
Living people
Sportspeople from Odesa Oblast
Ukrainian footballers
Association football forwards
FC Chornomorets Odesa players
FC Real Pharma Odesa players
FK Liepāja players
FC Hirnyk-Sport Horishni Plavni players
FC Lviv players
OFC Pirin Blagoevgrad players
Ukrainian Premier League players
Ukrainian First League players
Latvian Higher League players
Ukrainian expatriate footballers
Expatriate footballers in Latvia
Ukrainian expatriate sportspeople in Latvia
Expatriate footballers in Bulgaria
Ukrainian expatriate sportspeople in Bulgaria